The Sacred Nagi Tree of Kumano Hayatama Taisha is one of the Natural Monuments of Japan and is situated in Kumano Hayatama Taisha in Shingu city, Wakayama, Japan. Kumano Hayatama Taisha is one of three Kumano Sanzan shrine/temple sites, and is part of the UNESCO World Heritage Site "Sacred Sites and Pilgrimage Routes in the Kii Mountain Range". The nagi tree, Nageia nagi, is also called the broadleaf podocarpus.

It is said that this tree, which has grown to a height of 17.6 m and a circumference of 5.45 m, was planted as a memorial by Taira no Shigemori in Heiji 1 (1159).

See also
 List of individual trees

References

Tourist attractions in Wakayama Prefecture
World Heritage Sites in Japan
Religious buildings and structures in Wakayama Prefecture
Natural monuments of Japan
Individual trees in Japan